Lee Chul-Seung (Hangul: 이철승) (born June 29, 1972) is a male former table tennis player from South Korea. At the 1992 Summer Olympics in Barcelona he won the bronze medal in the men's doubles this time together with Kang Hee-Chan. Four years later he won the bronze medal in the men's doubles again together with Yoo Nam-Kyu at the 1996 Summer Olympics in Atlanta, United States.

He is best known as one of the top doubles players in South Korea for most of the 1990s and into the early 2000s (decade), teaming up with six different partners.

External links
profile

1972 births
Living people
South Korean male table tennis players
Table tennis players at the 1992 Summer Olympics
Table tennis players at the 1996 Summer Olympics
Table tennis players at the 2000 Summer Olympics
Table tennis players at the 2004 Summer Olympics
Olympic table tennis players of South Korea
Olympic bronze medalists for South Korea
Olympic medalists in table tennis
Asian Games medalists in table tennis
Table tennis players at the 1994 Asian Games
Table tennis players at the 1998 Asian Games
Table tennis players at the 2002 Asian Games
South Korean table tennis coaches

Medalists at the 1996 Summer Olympics
Medalists at the 1992 Summer Olympics
Asian Games gold medalists for South Korea
Asian Games silver medalists for South Korea
Medalists at the 1994 Asian Games
Medalists at the 1998 Asian Games
Medalists at the 2002 Asian Games